Eileen Gail de Planque (also Eileen Gail de Planque Burke, best known as E. Gail de Planque; 1944 – September 8, 2010) was an American nuclear physicist. An expert on environmental radiation measurements, she was the first woman and first health physicist to become a Commissioner at the US government's Nuclear Regulatory Commission (NRC).  Her technical areas of expertise included environmental radiation, nuclear facilities monitoring, personnel dosimetry, radiation shielding, radiation transport, and solid state dosimetry.

Career
Born in New Jersey and raised in Maryland,  Planque earned her bachelor's degree from Immaculata College (Mathematics, 1967), Master's degree from the Newark College of Engineering (Physics, 1973), and PhD from New York University (Environmental health science, 1983). From 1967 until 1982, she worked as a physicist for the Atomic Energy Commission. She joined the Environmental Measurements Laboratory, US Department of Energy as its deputy director in 1982, and was promoted to director five years later. From 1991-95, she was a member of the NRC. In 1997, Planque chaired a planning committee, Celebration of Women in Engineering, which developed conferences that encouraged women to choose careers in engineering and included the development of the website EngineerGirl.

A Fellow of the American Nuclear Society and the American Association for the Advancement of Science, Planque was also a member of the National Academy of Engineering, Association of Women in Science, and the National Council on Radiation Protection and Measurements. She served as president of the ANS (1988–89), and Health Physics Society; as well as the co-chair of Committee for International Intercomparison of Environmental Dosimeters. In the late 1970s, Planque was a US expert delegate to the international committee for Development of an International Standard on Thermoluminescence Dosimetry.

Dr. de Planque served as President of Strategy Matters, Inc., Director for Energy Strategists Consultancy, Ltd. Also served on the boards of Northeast Utilities Corporation, British Nuclear Fuels, EnergySolutions, Inc., Landauer, Inc., TXU Corporation, and BHP Billiton.

Personal life
Planque was married to Frank Burke. She lived in New York City, and Potomac, Maryland. Planque died in 2010.

Awards
 1990, Women of Achievement in Energy award 
 1991, Outstanding Woman Scientist of the Year award 
 2003, Henry DeWolf Smyth Award for Nuclear Statesmanship
 2004, Women in Technology International Hall of Fame inductees

References

1944 births
2010 deaths
Scientists from New Jersey
American nuclear physicists
American women physicists
Nuclear Regulatory Commission officials
Immaculata University alumni
New Jersey Institute of Technology alumni
New York University alumni
Health physicists
Fellows of the American Association for the Advancement of Science
20th-century American women scientists
21st-century American women scientists
20th-century American physicists
21st-century American physicists